The Southern Wide-field Gamma-ray Observatory (SWGO) is a gamma-ray observatory to be constructed in South America.
It is designed to detect air shower particles initiated by gamma rays entering the  Earth's atmosphere. 

The SWGO Collaboration involves more than 100 scientists from Argentina, Brazil, Bolivia, Chile, Czech Republic, Italy, Germany, Mexico, Peru, Portugal, South Korea, UK, USA.

SWGO will be the fist high-altitude gamma-ray observatory to provide wide-field coverage of a large portion of the southern sky. It will complement current and future instruments, such as  HAWC, LHAASO, and  CTA . 

SWGO will join the worldwide multi-messenger effort to unveil extreme astrophysical phenomena. Its main science topics are: the study of both galactic and extragalactic accelerators, such as supernova remnants, active galactic nuclei, and gamma-ray bursts; testing of particle physics beyond the Standard Model; the monitoring and study of gamma-ray bursts and Active Galacitc Nuclei flares; the characterisation of the cosmic ray flux of particles.

References 

Gamma-ray telescopes